Schinia sexata is a moth of the family Noctuidae. It is found in North America, where it is known only from southern Manitoba, Canada.

It was formerly considered a subspecies of Schinia villosa.

The larvae feed exclusively on Erigeron glabellus.

References

External links
Images
Butterflies and Moths of North America

Schinia
Moths of North America
Moths described in 1906